Unsung Heroes of American Industry is a 2001 short story collection by Mark Jude Poirier.

It was published by Miramax Books. It includes the short stories "Buttons", "Worms", "Gators", "Pageantry", and "A Note on the Type".

2001 short story collections
Short story collections by Mark Poirier